Boxing Gym is a 2010 American documentary film edited, produced, and directed by Frederick Wiseman. The film premiered at the 63rd Cannes Film Festival on May 20, 2010.

Critical response
Boxing Gym received critical acclaim from critics. Manohla Dargis of The New York Times designated it an "NYT Critics Pick", and stated that "It's... easy to get swept up by the beats in the film because Mr. Wiseman, among the most celebrated direct-cinema practitioners, eschews voiceovers, talking-head interviews, extraneous footage and the customary and sometimes superfluous like." Rob Nelson of Variety also praised the film, noting that while it is shorter than most of Wiseman's works, "the viewer learns an enormous amount from [Boxing Gym,] but not at all in the conventional documentary manner", and instead through "images that put the audience in close contact with the boxers’ routines". Eric Kohn of IndieWire remarked that Wiseman's filmmaking method resulted in "an ethnographic snapshot of restless people in their natural habitat."

References

External links
Zipporah Films official site

2010 films
2010 documentary films
American sports documentary films
Documentary films about boxing
Films directed by Frederick Wiseman
Films set in 2007
Films shot in Austin, Texas
2010s English-language films
2010s American films